Savitribai Phule Pune University (SPPU), formerly the University of Poona, is a collegiate public state university located in the city of Pune, India. It was established in 1949, and is spread over a  campus in the neighbourhood of Ganeshkhind. The university houses 46 academic departments. It has about 307 recognized research institutes and 612 affiliated colleges offering graduate and under-graduate courses. Savitribai Phule Pune University Ranked 12th NIRF Ranking in 2022

History
The University of Pune was established on 10 February 1949 under the Pune University Act passed by the Bombay legislature in 1948. M. R. Jayakar became its first vice-chancellor. Its first office was started from the Nizam Guest House, which is part of Bhandarkar Oriental Research Institute on Law College Road. The university was operated at Nizam Guest House until 1 June 1949. Its current building was originally called the Governor House. As its name suggests, it was the seasonal retreat of the governor of Bombay. B. G. Kher, Chief Minister and Education Minister of the government of Bombay, helped ensure the university received a large allocation of land for their campus. The university was allocated over 411 acres (1.66 km2).

The institution's name was changed from the University of Pune to Savitribai Phule Pune University on 9 August 2014 in honor of Savitribai Phule, the 19th century Indian social reformer who played an important role in improving the lives of women and the Dalit communities in Maharashtra during British colonial rule. She and her husband Mahatma Jyotiba Phule founded India's first native-run school for girls in 1848.

Organisation and administration

Governance

Jurisdiction
Initially the university had a jurisdiction extending over 12 districts of western Maharashtra. With the establishment of Shivaji University in Kolhapur in 1962, the jurisdiction was restricted to five districts: Pune, Ahmednagar, Nashik, Dhule, and Jalgaon. Out of these, two districts—Dhule and Jalgaon—are attached to the North Maharashtra University in Jalgaon established in August 1990.

Vice-Chancellors
Past and present vice-chancellors of the university are:

Departments
The university has various departments and centres, offering courses in science, social science, management, law, etc.
 Unipune introduces a bachelor's degree course in Environment Science. The course started from the academic year of 2018–2019.
 The Department of Foreign Languages was started in Ranade institute building in 1949. It offers courses for German, French, Russian, Japanese and Spanish languages from elementary level to post graduation courses. Batches are conducted in morning as well as in evening. Over 1500 students are enrolled every year.
 Competition Exam Center (CEC): is for coaching programs for various government competition exams.
 Krantijyoti Savitribai Phule Women's Studies Centre.

Rankings 

Savitribai Phule Pune University was ranked 601–800 in the world by the Times Higher Education World University Rankings of 2020, as well as 135 in Asia and 128 among Emerging Economies University Rankings in 2020.

It was ranked 19 in India overall by the National Institutional Ranking Framework in 2020 and 9th among universities.

Student life
The colleges of the university provide residences for students. The International Centre provides residences for international students, including visiting students.

Alumni and faculty

Alumni of Savitribai Phule Pune University include major politicians of India including Vishwanath Pratap Singh, 7th Prime Minister of India; 
Pratibha Patil, 12th President of India; 
Vilasrao Deshmukh, 17th and 19th Chief Minister of Maharashtra; and Sharad Pawar, former Chief Minister of Maharashtra. P. V. Narasimha Rao, 9th Prime Minister of India, graduated from Fergusson College, when the college was under the University of Pune.

Khaled Bahah, 2nd Vice President of Yemen and Prime Minister of Yemen, received his BCom and MCom from the university.

In science and engineering, notable alumni of the university include Padmanabhan Balaram, chemist and director of the Indian Institute of Science; Kantilal Mardia, statistician and Guy Medallists; Thomas Kailath, electrical engineer and recipient of the 2014 National Medal of Science; Vistasp Karbhari, civil engineer and the eighth president of the University of Texas at Arlington; Suhas Patankar, professor at the University of Minnesota, and pioneer in the field of computational fluid dynamics (CFD) and finite volume method; C. Kumar N. Patel, inventor of the carbon dioxide laser, recipient of the 1996 National Medal of Science and vice-Chancellor for Research at the University of California, Los Angeles; and Vinod Scaria, bioinformatician, who is known for sequencing the first Indian genome. V. S. Huzurbazar served as the first head of the statistics department. S.N. Sadasivan who was Civil Services trainer, Author and historian. Madhav Gadgil, an ecologist and Sulochana Gadgil, meteorologist.

Politician includes Agatha Sangma, K. T. Rama Rao, Prakash Javadekar, and Nabeel Rajab.

Academician Jyoti Gogte, graduated her BCom, MCom, and Ph.D. from the university, and was a Ph.D. guide for the university from 2006 to 2013.

Art collector and historian Dinkar G. Kelkar graduated his D. Litt. degree from the university in 1978.

See also
 List of universities in India
 Universities and colleges in India

References

External links

Pune university Information Center

 
Universities in Maharashtra
Educational institutions established in 1949
1949 establishments in India
Tourist attractions in Pune district